Emmanuel Oludaisi Adekunle is an Anglican bishop in Nigeria: he is the current Bishop of Egba.

Adekunle was born in Abeokuta on the 29 March 1962. He was educated at Abeokuta Grammar School, Federal Polytechnic Ilaro and Emmanuel College of Theology and Christian Education, lbadan. A former teacher and engineer, he was ordained in 1993. He became a Canon in 1999 and an archdeacon in 2001. In 2006 he was appointed the Provost  of the Cathedral of St. Peter, Ake. He was consecrated on Sunday, 23″’ August, 2009 at the Cathedral Church of St. Jude, Ebute Metta, Lagos.

Notes

]

Living people
Anglican bishops of Egba
21st-century Anglican bishops in Nigeria
People from Abeokuta
1962 births
Nigerian educators
Nigerian engineers
University of Ibadan alumni
Anglican provosts in Africa
People educated at Abeokuta Grammar School
Church of Nigeria archdeacons